Liatris aspera (known as rough blazing star, button blazing star, lacerate blazing star, tall prairie blazing star, or tall gayfeather) is a perennial wildflower in the Asteraceae family that is found in central to eastern North America in habitats that range from mesic to dry prairie and dry savanna.

Description

The inflorescence is an erect raceme with numerous, purple, button-like flower heads, short-stalked or stalkless, blooming from the top down. It flowers from mid-August through October, with seed becoming ripe in October to November.

Distribution and habitat
This plant is native to the United States from Texas to the west and New York to the east. It is also native to Ontario in Canada. It grows in prairies, glades, and savannas, and along roadsides and railroads.

Ecology
It attracts birds, hummingbirds, and butterflies.

References

aspera
Flora of the Eastern United States
Flora of the United States
Flora of North America